The list of shipwrecks in April 1820 includes ships sunk, wrecked or otherwise lost during April 1820.

1 April

2 April

6 April

7 April

8 April

10 April

11 April

15 April

21 April

25 April

26 April

28 April

30 April

Unknown date

References

1820-04